Campeonato Nacional de Fútbol de Cuba is the top division of the Asociación de Fútbol de Cuba, it was created in 1912. Despite being a league competition in CONCACAF, since 1990 none of the Cuban teams had played in CFU Club Championship or CONCACAF Champions' Cup until the CFU Club Championship 2007 eliminatory, when they participated after 15 years of absence.

Campeonato Nacional de Fútbol de Cuba – 2018

FC Camagüey (Minas)
FC Ciego de Ávila (Morón)
FC Cienfuegos
CF Granma (Bayamo)
FC Guantánamo
FC Isla de La Juventud (Nueva Gerona)
FC La Habana (Guanajay)
FC Las Tunas (Manatí)
FC Pinar del Río
FC Sancti Spíritus
FC Santiago de Cuba
FC Villa Clara (Zulueta)

Previous winners
There have been 100 titles won with three years not having a championship. The winner of the greatest number of titles is FC Villa Clara with 14 wins. Centro Gallego (La Habana) and Real Iberia (La Habana) (including Iberia) each have eight wins, Juventud Asturiana (La Habana) and FC Pinar del Río each have seven wins, FC Ciudad de La Habana (without La Habana/La Habana FC) and Deportivo San Francisco each have six wins, FC Ciego de Ávila, Granjeros and Deportivo Hispano América (La Habana) each have five wins, FC Cienfuegos, Industriales (La Habana), and FC La Habana (including La Habana FC) each have four wins, Santiago de Cuba and Mordazo has three wins, Azucareros, Deportivo Puentes Grandes, and Rovers AC (La Habana) each have two wins, and FC Artemisa, FC Camagüey, Casino Español, Cerro (La Habana), Deportivo Español (Santiago de Cuba), Diablos Rojos (Santiago de Cuba), Fortuna, CD Hatüey (La Habana), FC Holguín, and Olimpia each have only one win.

1912: Rovers AC (La Habana)
1913: CD Hatuey (La Habana)
1914: Rovers AC (La Habana)
1915: Hispano América (La Habana)
1916: La Habana FC
1917: Iberia (La Habana)
1918: Iberia (La Habana)
1919: Hispano América (La Habana)
1920: Hispano América (La Habana)
1921: Hispano América (La Habana)
1922: Iberia (La Habana)
1923: Iberia (La Habana)
1924: Olimpia (Manzanillo)
1925: Fortuna (Güines)
1926: Real Iberia (La Habana)
1927: Juventud Asturiana (La Habana)
1928: Real Iberia (La Habana)
1929: Real Iberia (La Habana)
1930: Deportivo Español
1931: DC Gallego (La Habana)
1932: DC Gallego (La Habana)
1933: Juventud Asturiana (La Habana)
1934: Real Iberia (La Habana)
1935: Juventud Asturiana (La Habana)
1936: Juventud Asturiana (La Habana)
1937: DC Gallego (La Habana)
1938: DC Gallego (La Habana)
1939: DC Gallego (La Habana)
1940: DC Gallego (La Habana)
1941: Juventud Asturiana (La Habana)
1942: Deportivo Puentes Grandes
1943: Deportivo Puentes Grandes
1944: Juventud Asturiana (La Habana)
1945: DC Gallego (La Habana)
1946: no championship
1947: DC Gallego (La Habana)
1948: Juventud Asturiana (La Havane)
1949: Diablos Rojos (Santiago de Cuba)
1950: Hispano América (La Habana)
1951: Deportivo San Francisco
1952: Deportivo San Francisco
1953: Deportivo San Francisco
1954: Deportivo San Francisco
1955: Deportivo San Francisco
1956: Casino Español
1957: Deportivo San Francisco
1958: Deportivo Mordazo
1959: Deportivo Mordazo
1960: Cerro (Havane)
1961: Deportivo Mordazo
1962: no championship
1963: Industriales (La Habana)
1964: Industriales (La Habana)
1965: FC La Habana
1966: FC La Habana
1967: FC La Habana
1968: Granjeros
1969: Granjeros
1970: Granjeros
1971: no championship
1972: Industriales (La Habana)
1973: Industriales (La Habana)
1974: Azucareros
1975: Granjeros
1976: Azucareros
1977: Granjeros
1978–79: FC Ciudad de La Habana
1979: FC Ciudad de La Habana
1980: FC Villa Clara
1981: FC Villa Clara
1982: FC Villa Clara
1983: FC Villa Clara
1984: FC Ciudad de La Habana
1985: FC Cienfuegos
1986: FC Villa Clara
1987: FC Pinar del Río
1988–89: FC Pinar del Río
1989–90: FC Pinar del Río
1990–91: FC Cienfuegos
1991–92: FC Pinar del Río
1992: FC Villa Clara
1993: FC Ciego de Ávila
1994: FC Ciudad de La Habana
1995: FC Pinar del Río
1996: FC Villa Clara
1997: FC Villa Clara
1998: FC Ciudad de La Habana
1999–00: FC Pinar del Río
2000–01: FC Ciudad de La Habana
2001–02: FC Pinar del Río
2002–03: FC Villa Clara
2003: FC Pinar del Río
2004–05: FC Villa Clara
2005–06: FC Holguín
2006–07: FC Pinar del Río
2007–08: FC Cienfuegos
2008–09: FC Cienfuegos
2009–10: FC Ciego de Ávila
2010–11: FC Villa Clara
2011–12: FC Villa Clara
2013: FC Villa Clara
2014: FC Ciego de Ávila
2015: FC Camagüey
2016: FC Villa Clara
2017: Santiago de Cuba
2018: Santiago de Cuba
2019: Santiago de Cuba
2019–20: Abandoned due to COVID-19
2020–21: Not held due to COVID-19
2022: Artemisa

Performance by club

Best Scorers

References

External links

 
1
Cuba
Sports leagues established in 1912
1912 establishments in Cuba
Professional sports leagues in Cuba